Giovanni Vastola (20 April 1938 – 19 January 2017) was an Italian professional footballer who played as a winger. He died in Ravenna on 19 January 2017 at the age of 78.

References

1938 births
2017 deaths
Association football midfielders
Italian footballers
Serie A players
L.R. Vicenza players
Bologna F.C. 1909 players
S.S.D. Varese Calcio players
Inter Milan players
Piacenza Calcio 1919 players
A.S.D. HSL Derthona players